Auernheimer is a Jewish surname. Notable people with the surname include:

Leonardo Auernheimer (1936–2010), Argentinian economist
Raoul Auernheimer (1876–1948), Austrian jurist and writer
Andrew Auernheimer (born 1985), American hacker and neo-nazi internet troll

German-language surnames
Jewish surnames
German toponymic surnames